Listed below is a list of Major League Baseball on ESPN Radio broadcasters by both name and year since the program's debut on ESPN Radio in .

By name

Sunday Night Baseball

Current
Marc Kestecher: (pregame host, 2008–present)
Jon Sciambi: (play-by-play, 2010–present)
Doug Glanville: (color commentator, 2022–present)

Former
Dave Campbell: (color commentator, 1999–2010)
Joe D'Ambrosio: (pregame host, 1998–2007)
Kevin Kennedy: (analyst, 1998)
Dan Shulman: (play-by-play, 2002–2007)
Chris Singleton: (color commentator, 2011–2021)
Charley Steiner: (play-by-play, 1998–2001)
Gary Thorne: (play-by-play, 2008–2009)

By year

Regular season

All-Star Game

Wild Card Game

Wild Card Series

Division Series

League Championship Series

World Series

World Baseball Classic Semis and Championship

Caribbean Series Round Robin

Caribbean Series Semis and Championship

See also
ESPN Major League Baseball
Baseball Tonight
Sunday Night Baseball
Monday Night Baseball
Wednesday Night Baseball
Major League Baseball on ESPN Radio
ESPN Major League Baseball broadcasters

External links
MLB on ESPN Radio
ESPN Radio

ESPN Radio broadcasters
ESPN Radio broadcasters
Major League Baseball on ESPN Radio broadcasters